Caecula is a genus of eels in the snake eel family Ophichthidae. It currently contains the following species:

 Caecula kuro (Nagamichi Kuroda, 1947)
 Caecula pterygera Vahl, 1794 (Finny snake-eel)

References

 

Ophichthidae
Taxa named by Martin Vahl